Oxera splendida is an evergreen vine in the family Lamiaceae which produces white, fragrant flowers and white, egg-shaped fruit. It naturally is occurs in the tropical rain forests of tropical Asia and Australia and is often sighted along rain forest margins such as roads. Some common names include October Glory, Glory Vine, Potato Vine and Fragrant Faradaya. Australian indigenous names include Garanggal used from Cairns to Yarrabah, Buku used in the Tully River area, Koie-yan used at Dunk Island and Djungeen used by the Girramay clan.

Description 
It flowers and fruits in the warmer months from August to April. The white, fragrant flowers are abundant but short lived, sometimes lasting only a single day. Each flower measures about 4.5 cm in diameter.

Taxonomy 
The species was first described as Faradaya splendida in 1865 by Victorian government botanist Ferdinand von Mueller in Fragmenta Phytographiae Australiae, based on plant material collected by John Dallachy near Rockingham Bay. This was the first species to be included in the genus Faradaya. In 2015 a revision of the genera Oxera, Clerodendrum, Faradaya, and Hosea resulted in Faradaya being moved to Oxera.

Distribution and habitat 
The species occurs in Sulawesi, the Moluccas, New Guinea, the Solomon Islands and Queensland. It can be found in rain forest, hill forest and swamp forest from sea level to 2000m. The tolerant vine can grow in clay and humus, and can inhabit both undisturbed, primary forest and previously disturbed, secondary forests. It is common to see the white fruited vine along rain forest margins such as roads.

Ecology
For several Australian butterflies, this species is a larval food plant. Those butterflies include Pseudodipsas eone, Hypochrysops miskini, Shining Oak-blue, Hypolycaena phorbas and Pale ciliate blue. For at least P. eone, this butterfly will seek out Oxera splendida leaves specifically for the extrafloral nectaries. The nectaries found on the leaves produce nectare and P. eone will only feed one leaves with this characteristic.

The Spectacled flying fox is a frugivore that eats O. splendida but is too small to consume and disperse the seed internally. It may disperse the fruit short distances by carrying the fruit. The much larger Southern cassowary also feeds on the fruit (it is one of the largest that the cassowary can ingest) and it disperses the seeds over large distances. The fruit and seed of this plant are both consumed by the Musky rat-kangaroo. The rat-kangaroo is too small to swallow the seed whole but will chew at it.

This species is one of the prominent vine species that thrive in heavily cyclone damaged forest, otherwise known as cyclone scrub. These areas of forest tend to have a low, uneven canopy level due to damage from local intensification of cyclonic winds where several vine species will grow into the canopy.

Uses 
Oxera splendida is grown as a decorative plant in gardens. Its flowers are attractive and have a pleasant fragrance. When provided with plenty of sunlight and water, the vine is hardy and grows vigorously.

For the Australian Aboriginal Girramay clan, the Djungeen vine is an indicator plant. When the egg-like fruit falls to the ground in October, Bush Turkey nests will have eggs in them.

Another aboriginal use is to poison fish. The outer bark is removed and the middle layer of the bark is scraped off, then rubbed onto a hot stone. When the stone is thrown into a creek or small lagoon, all marine animals in the water are poisoned and death occurs within an hour. A sapotoxin is found in the leaves, stems and roots of the plant which is an effective fish poison. It will readily dissolve in water and is effective even in low concentrations.

Based on a word of mouth report, the fruit is said to be edible but is not desired.

Gallery

References

External links
 Faradaya splendida photo collection on Flickr
 Image of Faraday splendida growing on the State Library of Queensland, Brisbane

Lamiaceae
Flora of Borneo
Flora of Sulawesi
Flora of the Maluku Islands
Flora of Papuasia
Flora of Queensland
Taxa named by Ferdinand von Mueller